Jake Evans may refer to:

 Jake Evans (baseball) (1856–1907), Major League Baseball right fielder
 Jake Evans (footballer) (born 1998), English footballer
 Jake Evans (ice hockey) (born 1996), Canadian ice hockey player

See also
Jacob Evans (born 1997), American basketball player